Malith Cooray (born 30 January 1990) is a Sri Lankan cricketer. He made his first-class debut for Sebastianites Cricket and Athletic Club in the 2009–10 Premier Trophy on 23 October 2009.

References

External links
 

1990 births
Living people
Sri Lankan cricketers
Burgher Recreation Club cricketers
Kurunegala Youth Cricket Club cricketers
Sebastianites Cricket and Athletic Club cricketers
Sri Lanka Navy Sports Club cricketers
Place of birth missing (living people)